Orange Marmalade is a 2015 South Korean television series based on the webtoon of the same name which was serialized on Naver WEBTOON from 2011 to 2013. Starring Yeo Jin-goo, Kim Seolhyun, Lee Jong-hyun and Gil Eun-hye, it aired on KBS2 from May 15 to July 24, 2015 on Fridays at 22:35 for 12 episodes.

Plot
Set in a fantasy world where humans and vampires coexist, the latter have evolved and no longer rely on human blood as food. Still, they are feared and discriminated against by society, causing many of them to hide their true nature and live as "normal" citizens, or else become outcasts.

Baek Ma-ri (Kim Seolhyun) is a socially withdrawn teenage girl hiding her vampire identity. Driven away from several neighborhoods, she is eager to settle down in her new city and live quietly. But things change when she accidentally kisses the neck of Jung Jae-min (Yeo Jin-goo) and falls in love with him. Despite that he is the most popular boy at her high school.

Cast

Main characters
Yeo Jin-goo as Jung Jae-min
Song Ui-joon as young Jae-min
He is the most popular boy in school. His mother married a vampire when he was in middle school, causing him to quit music. He has hated vampires ever since. He falls for Baek Ma-ri when she transfers to his school, not knowing that she is a vampire.

Kim Seol-hyun as Baek Ma-ri 
As a child she was shunned and became an outcast. Determined to graduate from high school, she transfers to a new school and hides her vampire identity. She eventually falls for Jung Jae-min, but is caught in a love triangle with her childhood friend and fellow vampire, Han Si-hoo. She dreams of becoming a musician.

Lee Jong-hyun as Han Si-hoo 
Kang Han-byeol as young Si-hoo
He is a vampire and Baek Ma-ri's childhood friend. His uncle had married Jung Jae-min's mother when he was in middle school. He has feelings for Ma-ri, and becomes involved in a love triangle with her and Jae-min.

Gil Eun-hye as Jo Ah-ra
She is the most popular girl in school. Used to getting her way, she doesn't like the fact that Baek Ma-ri has captured Jung Jae-min's attention. She resorts to bullying Ma-ri and hiding that fact behind her sweet demeanor.

Supporting characters
Ahn Gil-kang as Baek Seung-hoon
Yoon Ye-hee as Song Sun-hwa
Song Jong-ho as Han Yoon-jae
Lee Il-hwa as Kang Min-ha
Jo Yi-hyun as Baek Joseph
Jo Min-ki as Jung Byung-kwon
Jung Hae-kyun as Jo Joon-gu
Oh Kyung-min as Choi Soo-ri
Park Gun-woo as Hwang Beom-sung
Lee Da-heen as Ae-kyung
Kim Ji-ah as Yoon Min-sun
Lee Yoo as Ah-ra and Ae-kyung's friend
Joo Ho as Biology teacher

Ratings

Key: -lowest rated episode; -highest rated episode.

The series also aired on KBS World two weeks after its initial broadcast, with subtitles.

Awards and nominations

See also 
List of vampire television series

References

External links 
  
 
 
 

2015 South Korean television series debuts
2015 South Korean television series endings
Korean Broadcasting System television dramas
Television shows based on South Korean webtoons
Korean-language television shows
South Korean teen dramas
South Korean romantic fantasy television series
Vampires in television
Television series about teenagers
Television series set in the Joseon dynasty
South Korean high school television series